Charles Magnus Gelbert (January 26, 1906 – January 13, 1967) was a professional baseball player. He played all or part of ten seasons in Major League Baseball for the St. Louis Cardinals (1929–32 and 1935–36), Cincinnati Reds (1937), Detroit Tigers (1937), Washington Senators (1939–40) and Boston Red Sox (1940), primarily as a shortstop.

Early career
Gelbert, who was born in Scranton, Pennsylvania, attended Wissahickon High School in Ambler, Pennsylvania, and graduated from Lebanon Valley College in 1928.
He was the son of American football player Charlie Gelbert, a College Football Hall of Fame end for the University of Pennsylvania who later had a brief professional football career with the early athletic clubs.

Gelbert began his professional career in 1926 with the minor league Syracuse Stars. He was acquired by the Cardinals from the Topeka Jayhawks of the Western Association in 1927, and made his Major League debut less than two years later.

Major League career
Gelbert was the Cardinals' starting shortstop from 1929 to 1932, including the pennant-winning team of 1930, as well as the team that won the 1931 World Series. He finished 25th in voting for the 1931 National League MVP for playing in 131 games and having 447 at bats, 61 runs, 129 hits, 29 doubles, 5 triples, 1 home run, 62 RBI, 7 stolen bases, 54 walks, .289 batting average, .365 on-base percentage, .383 slugging percentage, 171 total bases and 4 sacrifice hits.

Gelbert's career was nearly ended when he severely injured his left ankle in a hunting accident, costing him two full seasons. He returned in 1935, but spent the rest of his career as a utility infielder.

In nine seasons, Gelbert played in 876 games and had 2,869 at bats, 398 runs, 766 hits, 169 doubles, 43 triples, 17 home runs, 350 RBI, 34 stolen bases, 290 walks, .267 batting average, .336 on-base percentage, .374 slugging percentage, 1,072 total bases and 49 sacrifice hits.

Later life
After his playing career, Gelbert served as the coach of the Lafayette College baseball team for 21 years, from 1946 to 1966. He also briefly served as manager of the Hornell Dodgers of the Pennsylvania–Ontario–New York League (PONY League) in 1956. On January 13, 1967, Gelbert died in Easton, Pennsylvania, at the age of 60.

References

External links

1906 births
1967 deaths
Major League Baseball shortstops
Major League Baseball third basemen
St. Louis Cardinals players
Cincinnati Reds players
Detroit Tigers players
Washington Senators (1901–1960) players
Boston Red Sox players
Brooklyn Dodgers scouts
Los Angeles Dodgers scouts
Syracuse Stars (minor league baseball) players
Topeka Jayhawks players
Rochester Red Wings players
Toledo Mud Hens players
Lafayette Leopards baseball coaches
Louisville Colonels (minor league) players
Montreal Royals players
Minor league baseball managers
Lebanon Valley Flying Dutchmen baseball players
Sportspeople from Scranton, Pennsylvania
Baseball players from Pennsylvania